Din Meraj (born 14 August 1925) is a former Pakistani cyclist. He competed in three events at the 1956 Summer Olympics.

References

External links
 

1925 births
Possibly living people
Pakistani male cyclists
Olympic cyclists of Pakistan
Cyclists at the 1956 Summer Olympics
Place of birth missing (living people)